Four of Arrows is the second full-length album from American indie rock group Great Grandpa.

Track listing

References

2019 albums